Paolo Grossi (29 January 1933 – 4 July 2022) was an Italian judge. He was President of the Constitutional Court of Italy between 24 February 2016 and 23 February 2018. Grossi served as Judge on the Court from 23 February 2009 to 23 February 2018.

Career
Grossi was born in Florence. He was a law professor before he was appointed to the Constitutional Court by the President of Italy, Giorgio Napolitano, on 17 February 2009. Grossi was sworn in on 23 February 2009.

At the University of Florence he worked as a professor of History of Medieval and Modern Law.

Grossi was presented with the golden medal of the Italian Order of Merit for Culture and Art on 28 June 1985 and made Knight Grand Cross in the Order of Merit of the Italian Republic on 25 February 2009.

He was an Honorary Editor of the University of Bologna Law Review, a general student-edited law journal published by the Department of Legal Studies of the University of Bologna.

Works
 Italian Civil Lawyers: An Historical Profile (2002)
 Law between Power and the Judicial System (2005)
 Society, Law, State: A Recovery for Law (2007)
 The Medieval Judicial System (2008)
 First Lesson on Law (2008)

References

|-

1933 births
2022 deaths
20th-century Italian jurists
People from Florence
Academic staff of the University of Florence
Academic staff of the University of Macerata
Judges of the Constitutional Court of Italy
Presidents of the Constitutional Court of Italy
Recipients of the Italian Order of Merit for Culture and Art
Knights Grand Cross of the Order of Merit of the Italian Republic